The House of Bibescu or Bibesco is the name of an old Romanian noble family, whose members were once ruling Princes of Wallachia.

History 
The Princely Bibescu family was of Wallachian origin, first time documented in the 15th century, has marked the political and economical development of the country, through many generations.

Princes Stirbey 
Prince Barbu Dimitrie Știrbei was the son of Boyar Dumitrache Bibescu, Palatine of Wallachia (1772–1831), and his wife, Ecaterina Văcărescu (1777–1842). He was adopted by his relation, one of the most prestigious Oltenian, Vornic Barbu C. Știrbei, the last of the Știrbey line of the family who left him heir to his wealth and also family name. Upon the adoption, this line of the Bibescu family became House of Stirbey.

After the Revolution of 1848, in difficult times, Prince Barbu Stirbey (1799–1869) is elected Reigning Prince (“Domnitor”) of Tara Romaneasca, and seeks balanced relationships with the Ottoman Empire, the Austro-Hungarian Empire and with the Russian Empire, thus setting the foundations for an independent state. Under his rule (1849–1856), Tara Romaneasca went from a feudal and agriculture-based country to an enlightened nation, with its first industrial enterprises, a modern educational system and a well developed road network.

Notable members 
Antoine Bibesco (1878–1951), Romanian aristocrat, lawyer, diplomat and writer
Elena Bibescu (1855–1902), Romanian noblewoman and pianist, mother of Antoine
Elizabeth Bibesco (1897–1945), English writer and socialite, wife of Antoine
George Valentin Bibescu (1880–1941), Romanian aviation pioneer and automobile enthusiast
Gheorghe Bibescu (1804–1873), Prince of Wallachia
Marițica Bibescu (1815–1859), Princess-consort of Wallachia, wife of Gheorge
Marthe Bibesco (1886–1973), Romanian-French writer and socialite

References